During the 2005–06 season, SV Werder Bremen played in the Bundesliga, the highest tier of the German football league system.

Season summary
Werder Bremen climbed to second place in the final table, 5 points behind Bayern Munich. They were also the league's highest scoring team, with 79. Miroslav Klose was the league's top scorer with 25.

Players

First-team squad
Squad at end of season

Left club during season

Werder Bremen II

Youth team

References

Notes

Werder Bremen
2006